Tuckerang is a rural locality in the Western Downs Region, Queensland, Australia.

Geography 
Inverai is a neighbourhood in the north-west of locality.

Haystack is a neighbourhood in the south-west of the locality on the boundary with Warra.

History 
George Wood acquired land in the area in 1906 which he called Inverai, which is suspected to be a name he made up.

Inverai Provisional School opened on 5 October 1908. On 1 January 1909, it became Inverai State School. It closed on 31 December 1960. It was on the north-western corner of Inverai Road and Warra Canaga Creek Road.

Daiwan State School opened in 1910. It may also have been known as Haystack Plains State School. In 1924, it was renamed Haystack State School. It closed in 1968. In 1921, it was on the south-west corner of Haystack Noola Road and Haystack North Road in Tuckerang. In 1938, it was at 1054 Haystack Road in neighbouring Warra.

Tuckerang Provisional School opened in 1924 and closed circa 1929.

References

Further reading 

  — includes Blackwood State School, Belah State School, Ehlma State School, Haystack State School, Mulga State School, Noola State School, and Wychie State School

Western Downs Region
Localities in Queensland